The 1994 Alaska Milkmen season was the ninth season of the franchise in the Philippine Basketball Association (PBA).

Draft picks

Notable dates
March 6: The Milkmen unravelled an array of quality rookies in their first win of the regular season as they clipped Shell Rimula-X, 119-95, in the second game of the opening double-header. The win was Alaska's 11th straight after sweeping all their pre-season games, including the Guam Invitationals. 

July 19: Alaska weathered a brief uprising by Swift late in the third quarter and leaned on import Marques Bragg and playmaker Johnny Abarrientos in the final period to post a 94-84 victory and put the Milkmen on top of the Commissioners Cup standings with their sixth triumph in eight games.

Finals' return
After three seasons and a total of seven conferences on non-finals appearance, the Alaska Milkmen return to the championship series in the Commissioner's Cup. Their import, the imposing Marques Bragg, help the Milkmen top the eliminations with nine wins and two losses and emerge with the league-best 14-5 won-loss record after the semifinal round. Alaska lost to Purefoods Tender Juicy Hotdogs in the title series in five games.

2nd championship
For the first time in five years, the Milkmen gambled on a new import Sean Gay in the third conference instead of Sean Chambers. Alaska lost two of their first three games in the Governor's Cup with Gay and the team decided to bring back old-hand Chambers to replaced him.  

The Milkmen for the second straight conference are back in the championship round, this time against the Swift Mighty Meaties, Sean Chambers led Alaska to their second PBA title by winning over Swift in six games.

Roster

Recruited imports

References

Alaska Aces (PBA) seasons
Alaska